Joseph Bartlett Choynski (November 8, 1868 – January 24, 1943) was an American boxer who fought professionally from 1888 to 1904.

Boxing career
"Chrysanthemum Joe", the son of a Jewish Polish immigrant who settled in California in 1867, weighed no more than 176 lb (80 kg) throughout his career but regularly fought heavyweights.  He was considered a heavy puncher and a dangerous fighter.

In fact, James J. Jeffries claimed that the hardest blow he ever received in a bout came from Choynski during their 20-round draw. During that bout, Choynski hit Jeffries with a right hand so powerful that the punch drove one of Jeffries' teeth into his lip.  The tooth was lodged so deeply that one of Jeffries' cornermen was forced to cut it out with a knife between rounds.

A contemporary of heavyweight champion "Gentleman Jim" (James J. Corbett), the two fought professionally three times.  Both were from the San Francisco area, and thus generated a lot of local interest in their rivalry.  The highlight of their series of bouts was fought on June 5, 1889, on a barge off the coast of Benicia, California.

The principals agreed that the bout was to be fought wearing two ounce gloves.  Corbett had apparently hurt his hand, and Choynski learned of the injury.  Accordingly, Choynski "forgot" to bring his gloves to the match, thereby hoping the fight would proceed as a bare-knuckle bout.  Corbett, however, declined to fight bare-knuckle, but agreed to allow Choynski to wear leather riding gloves borrowed from a spectator.  The riding gloves were seamed, and caused Corbett to suffer many cuts and welts.  Nevertheless, Corbett won the legendary bout when he KOed Choynski in the 27th round.

In 1892 he KOd a 39-year-old legend in Boston's George Godfrey.

Choynski was never given an opportunity to fight for the heavyweight title, but enjoyed some stunning successes against famed heavyweights James J. Jeffries and Jack Johnson before they became champions.  For example, he held the heavier, larger, and stronger Jeffries to a 20-round draw on November 30, 1892.  On February 25, 1901, he faced and KO'ed the young Jack Johnson in three rounds.  He then began to train Johnson, helping the younger man develop the style that enabled him to become world champion.

Choynski also fought six-round draws with two other men who later claimed the heavyweight championship of the world: Bob Fitzsimmons on June 17, 1894, and Marvin Hart on November 16, 1903.

Personal life
Choynski was born in San Francisco to a Jewish family, the son of Harriet (née Ashim) and Isidor Nathan Choynski. He had 4 siblings, Herbert, Miriam, Maurice, and Edwin.

In 1895, Choynski married Louise Anderson Miller, an actress, in Cincinnati, Ohio.

Halls of Fame
In 1998, Choynski’s ability and ring-record were officially recognised by his induction into the International Boxing Hall of Fame.

Choynski, who was Jewish, was inducted into the International Jewish Sports Hall of Fame in 1991.

Professional boxing record
All information in this section is derived from BoxRec, unless otherwise stated.

Official record

All newspaper decisions are officially regarded as “no decision” bouts and are not counted in the win/loss/draw column.

Unofficial record

Record with the inclusion of newspaper decisions in the win/loss/draw column.

See also
List of bare-knuckle boxers
List of select Jewish boxers

References

External links
 

1868 births
1943 deaths
American male boxers
American people of Polish-Jewish descent
Bare-knuckle boxers
Boxers from San Francisco
Heavyweight boxers
International Boxing Hall of Fame inductees
Jewish American boxers